The steppe grey shrike (Lanius excubitor pallidirostris) is a large songbird species in the shrike family (Laniidae) native to Central Asia and parts of northern China, Iran, Afghanistan and Pakistan. Formerly considered a subspecies of the southern grey shrike (Lanius meridionalis) complex, it is now classified as a subspecies of the great grey shrike.

Taxonomy
The steppe grey shrike was described by the American ornithologist John Cassin in 1851 under its current binomial name Lanius pallidirostris. The generic Lanius is Latin for a "butcher" and the specific pallidirostris combines the Latin pallidus for "pale" and -rostris for "billed". The species is monotypic.

References

Steppe grey shrike
Steppe grey shrike
Birds of Central Asia
Steppe grey shrike